Safar Shah (also Romanized as Şafar Shāh and Şefr Shāh; also known as Gūrājū Şafar Shāh and Kūrāb Şafar Shāh) is a village in Gurani Rural District, Gahvareh District, Dalahu County, Kermanshah Province, Iran. At the 2006 census, its population was 278, in 71 families.

References 

Populated places in Dalahu County